Waverly Village Hall may refer to:

Waverly Village Hall (Waverly, Minnesota)
Waverly Village Hall (Waverly, New York)

Architectural disambiguation pages